Fuengirola Mosque is an Islamic place of worship in Fuengirola, Province of Málaga, Andalusia, Spain. It is also known as the  Suhail Islamic Cultural Centre.

Background
The construction of the mosque started in 1983 and finished in 1994. It was funded by Saudi Arabia.

The mosque's leader, Mohamed Kamal Mostafa, served a jail term of a year and three months for inciting violence towards women.

See also
 Islam in Spain

References

Mosques in Spain
Mosque
Mosques completed in 1994
1994 establishments in Spain